Come Out Fighting may refer to:

Come Out Fighting (1945 film), an American film
Come Out Fighting (1973 film), an Australian film